Millsite is a pictograph area in south-central Utah, USA in the San Rafael Swell, four miles west of the town of Ferron. There are four main rock faces, called panels, in the Millsite area, which were utilized for pictographic art.

Description
The Fremont Indians painted and chiseled the rock surface away, leaving their stories. The first panel is on a hill and is mostly unknown. It used to be filled with detailed writings but now there are only a few left, but they still have great detail. Each subject has eyes, noses and even mouths, which is more common with the more recent Indians. The second panel is full of delicately carved petroglyphs, with subjects ranging from odd shapes to deer and people. The third panel is full of Fremont petroglyphs, most of which are not easily identified. Without crossing the stream, you can only see a few writings with the naked eye. The fourth and final panel is moderately known. People from all over the state of Utah come to see this panel, but many often miss most of the writings. Because of the lack of visits to these, they are in extraordinary shape, and are still a deep red color and very detailed. The petroglyphs are also in great condition, some reaching up to five feet tall.

Pre-statehood history of Utah
Fremont culture
Geography of Emery County, Utah
Petroglyphs in Utah